Flight 435 may refer to:

Invicta International Airlines Flight 435, crashed on 10 April 1973
Aeroflot Flight 435, crashed on 19 December 1985

0435